Thomas MacBride may refer to:

 Thomas Jamison MacBride, American judge and politician
Thomas Huston Macbride, president of the University of Iowa

See also
Thomas McBride (disambiguation)